Pink Lady Island is one of the many uninhabited Canadian arctic islands in Qikiqtaaluk Region, Nunavut. It is a Baffin Island offshore island located in Frobisher Bay, southeast of Iqaluit. Other islands in the immediate vicinity include Algerine Island, Alligator Island, Frobisher's Farthest, Low Island, and Mitchell Island.

References 

Uninhabited islands of Qikiqtaaluk Region
Islands of Baffin Island
Islands of Frobisher Bay